The Fokus is a Luxembourgish political party founded on 21 February 2022.

Founding members are the former CSV president Frank Engel, the former Democratic Party general secretary Marc Ruppert, the former president of the trade confederation and DP member Gary Kneip and the lawyer and green municipal council of Esch-Uelzecht, Luc Majerus.

Fokus, according to its own statements, is a "pragmatic party without a fixed ideology, located in the center of the political spectrum".

Frank Engel is the party's leading candidate in the 2023 general election.

References 

Political parties in Luxembourg
Political parties established in 2022